"Worldwide" is a song by American pop group, Big Time Rush. It is the third single from their debut album, BTR and was released on July 23, 2011. A digital EP was released on August 5, 2011 and includes 2 remixes of "Til I Forget About You" and "Stuck", while the CD single only has the Cash Cash remix of "Til I Forget About You".

Background and composition
"Worldwide" was written by Eddie Serrano, Emily Phillips and Chris Rojas while production was also handled by Rojas. The song runs at 160 BPM and is in the key of E major.

In 2020, the band got back together virtually and released an acoustic version of "Worldwide" for fans to celebrate the 10 year anniversary of the song. The video was uploaded to band member Carlos PenaVega's YouTube channel. The group re-released an acoustic version of song as a single in 2022.

Reception
Markos Papadatos of Digital Journal praised the acoustic version of "Worldwide". He stated, "This version of 'Worldwide' deserves to be enjoyed for its honesty, beauty, and authenticity. Papadatos also complimented their harmonies for its "soaring" and "simply divine" sound.

Music video
The music video for "Worldwide" was released on June 17, 2011 via VEVO. The music video was directed by Scott Fellows and includes actress Katelyn Tarver who also appears on the Big Time Rush TV series as "Jo Taylor". Clips of the video were featured in the Big Time Rush episode "Big Time Break Up".

Commercial performance
The single peaked at number 3 on the Billboard Kid Digital Song Sales chart lasting 27 weeks and reached the 2011 Billboard Year-End Kid Digital Song Sales chart at number 16. In Germany, the song peaked at number 81 and lasted 2 weeks on chart. The song has sold over a million digital downloads as of 2011. The song was certified gold by RIAA in November 2022.

Track listing
Worldwide EP
"Worldwide" – 3:44
"Til I Forget About You (Halatrax Remix)" – 3:49
"Til I Forget About You (Cash Cash Remix)" – 4:01
"Stuck" – 3:05

CD single
"Worldwide" – 3:44
"Til I Forget About You (Cash Cash Remix)" – 4:01

Digital single
"Worldwide (Acoustic)" – 3:50

Charts

Weekly charts

Year-end charts

Certifications

Release history

References

2011 singles
Big Time Rush songs
2011 songs
Columbia Records singles